Tomáš Jasko (born December 9, 1983) is a Slovak professional ice hockey player who currently plays for HC Bratislava B of the Slovak 2. Liga.

Jasko played in the Slovak Extraliga with HC Slovan Bratislava, HK 36 Skalica, HKm Zvolen, MHC Martin and HK Poprad. He also played 95 games for SaiPa in the Finnish SM-liiga.

References

External links

1983 births
Living people
Arystan Temirtau players
Des Moines Buccaneers players
VEU Feldkirch players
Kiekko-Vantaa players
Lempäälän Kisa players
MHC Martin players
Mikkelin Jukurit players
HK Poprad players
SaiPa players
Saryarka Karagandy players
HK 36 Skalica players
Slovak ice hockey forwards
HC Slovan Bratislava players
Ice hockey people from Bratislava
HKM Zvolen players
Slovak expatriate ice hockey players in the United States
Slovak expatriate ice hockey players in Finland
Expatriate ice hockey players in Kazakhstan
Expatriate ice hockey players in Austria
Slovak expatriate sportspeople in Kazakhstan
Slovak expatriate sportspeople in Austria